Mark Knowles and Brian MacPhie were the defending champions but only MacPhie competed that year with Nenad Zimonjić.

MacPhie and Zimonjić lost in the semifinals to John-Laffnie de Jager and Robbie Koenig.

Wayne Black and Kevin Ullyett won in the final 6–3, 4–6, [10–5] against de Jager and Koenig.

Seeds
Champion seeds are indicated in bold text while text in italics indicates the round in which those seeds were eliminated.

 Mahesh Bhupathi /  Leander Paes (first round)
 Wayne Black /  Kevin Ullyett (champions)
 Brian MacPhie /  Nenad Zimonjić (semifinals)
 Andrew Florent /  David Macpherson (first round)

Draw

External links
 2002 Siebel Open Doubles draw

SAP Open
2002 ATP Tour